A Galway County Council election was held in County Galway in Ireland on 24 May 2019 as part of that year's local elections. All 39 councillors were elected for a five-year term of office from 7 local electoral areas (LEAs) by single transferable vote.

Following a recommendation of the 2018 Boundary Committee, the boundaries of the LEAs were altered from those used in the 2014 elections. Its terms of reference required no change in the total number of councillors but set a maximum LEA size of seven councillors, which three of the 2014 LEAs exceeded. Other changes were necessitated by population shifts revealed by the 2016 census.

This is expected to be the last election to Galway County Council as plans were announced in 2018 to merge the County Council and the City Council by 2021.

Fianna Fáil had a very good election, winning 3 additional seats and increasing their vote by over 5%. Fine Gael lost a seat to fall to 11 but also increased their vote. The Greens gained 1 seat in Conamara and Republican Sinn Féin retained their single seat. Sinn Féin lost 2 seats to be reduced to just 1 member. However, Gabe Cronelly who had quit the party since 2014 was re-elected as an independent.

Results by party

Tomás Ó Curraoin appeared on the ballot as an independent (non-party) but is a member of Republican Sinn Féin and is the sole public representative of that party.

Results by local electoral area

Athenry–Oranmore

Ballinasloe

Conamara North

Conamara South

Tomás Ó Curraoin appeared on the ballot as an independent (non-party) but is a member of Republican Sinn Féin and is the sole public representative of that party.

Gort–Kinvara

Loughrea

Tuam

Results by gender

Changes since 2019
† On 29 November 2019, Councillor Aisling Dolan announced that she had joined Fine Gael and was appointed as a candidate for the following general election in the Roscommon-Galway constituency.

Footnotes

Sources

References

2019 Irish local elections
2019